FC Minyor Radnevo  (ПФК Миньор Раднево) is a Bulgarian football club from the town of Radnevo, currently playing in the South-East Third League, the third division of Bulgarian football.

Honours
Cup of the Soviet Army
 Runners-up (1): 1989

Current squad
As of 1 February 2020

External links
Club Profile at bgclubs.eu

Minyor Radnevo
1952 establishments in Bulgaria
Association football clubs established in 1952
Mining association football clubs in Bulgaria